Lokitaung Airport is an airport in Lokitaung, Kenya.

Location
Lokitaung Airport  is located in Turkana County, in the town of Lokitaung, in the northwestern part of the Republic of Kenya, close to the International borders with Ethiopia and South Sudan.

The geographic coordinates of Lodwar Airport are:4° 19' 12.00"N, 35° 41' 24.00"E (Latitude:4.320000; Longitude:35.690000).

Overview
Lokitaung  Airport is a civilian airport that serves the town of Lokitaung and surrounding communities.

Airlines and destinations
There is no regular, scheduled airline service to Lokitaung Airport at this time.

See also
 Kenya Airports Authority
 Kenya Civil Aviation Authority
 List of airports in Kenya

References

External links
  Location of Lokitaung Airport At Google Maps
  Website of Kenya Airports Authority
 

Airports in Kenya
Airports in Rift Valley Province
Turkana County